The 2017 BB&T Atlanta Open was a professional men's tennis tournament played on hard courts. It was the 30th edition of the tournament, and part of the 2017 ATP World Tour and the 2017 US Open Series. It took place at Atlantic Station in Atlanta, United States between July 24 and 30, 2017. It was the first men's event of the 2017 US Open Series.

Singles main-draw entrants

Seeds 

 1 Rankings are as of July 17, 2017

Other entrants 
The following players received wildcards into the singles main draw:
  Christopher Eubanks
  Taylor Fritz
  Reilly Opelka

The following player received entry using a protected ranking:
  John Millman

The following players received entry as special exempts:
  Bjorn Fratangelo
  Peter Gojowczyk

The following players received entry from the qualifying draw:
  Quentin Halys
  Stefan Kozlov
  Tommy Paul
  Tim Smyczek

Withdrawals
Before the tournament
  Kevin Anderson →replaced by  Konstantin Kravchuk
  Dan Evans →replaced by  Lukáš Lacko
  Nick Kyrgios →replaced by  Guido Pella
  Adrian Mannarino →replaced by  Thomas Fabbiano
  Bernard Tomic →replaced by  Dudi Sela
  Mischa Zverev →replaced by  Vasek Pospisil

ATP doubles main-draw entrants

Seeds

1 Rankings are as of July 17, 2017

Other entrants
The following pairs received wildcards into the doubles main draw:
  Jordan Cox /  Emil Reinberg 
  Eric Sock /  Jack Sock

Finals

Singles 

  John Isner defeated  Ryan Harrison, 7–6(8–6), 7–6(9–7)

Doubles 

  Bob Bryan /  Mike Bryan defeated  Wesley Koolhof /  Artem Sitak,  6–3, 6–4

References

External links 
 

2017 ATP World Tour
2017
2017 in American tennis
2017 in sports in Georgia (U.S. state)
July 2017 sports events in the United States
2017 in Atlanta